Monte di Malo is a town in the province of Vicenza, Veneto, Italy. It is west of the road SP46.

The hamlet of Priabon in the commune gives its name to the Priabonian Age of the Eocene Epoch of geological time.

References

External links
(Google Maps)

Cities and towns in Veneto